Howe is a town in Grayson County, Texas, United States. The population was 3,451 in the 2020 U.S. Census. It is part of the Sherman–Denison metropolitan statistical area.

History

The first settlers in the area arrived around the time of the Texas Revolution in 1836. In 1843,  the last Indian battle in Grayson County was said to have been fought in the area. The first settlers of Howe were Jabez and Harriet Haning, and Jabez's brother John. They received land through the Peters colony after their arrival from Pennsylvania before 1850. The Houston and Texas Central Railway built through the area in 1873, and a railroad switch was located in the community. In 1873, when Summit received a post office, two businesses were located at the switch—a general store and a saloon. Several houses were built to the east of the switch. Jabez Haning persuaded the railroad to establish a depot on his land by donating every second lot in his newly platted town to the railroad. The names of the depot, the store, and the post office were changed in 1876 to "Howe", after F. M. Howe, who worked for the Houston and Texas Central. Howe had three saloons until around 1900, when the town voted to go dry. Its first one-room school building opened in 1877 and was replaced by a two-story building in 1884.

In 1884, Howe was incorporated, with George M. McCrary as mayor. By the late 1880s, the town had become a major grain shipping center and was the home of red rust-proof oats. A number of seed companies had their beginnings there in that decade. Howe became home to a Farmers' Alliance Cooperative Association, which was absorbed by the Howe Grain and Mercantile Company in 1894. In 1890, Howe had a population of 450, a steam gristmill, a Farmers' Alliance Cooperative, and Baptist and Methodist churches, as well as a number of hotels, doctors, druggists, and barbers. Several newspapers were published in Howe, such as the Howe Herald from 1890 to the 1910s and the Howe Messenger in the late 1930s and early '40s. During the 1930s, the Howe Chronicle was published by former Governor James E. Ferguson and his brother A. M. Ferguson. The Howe Enterprise was established in 1963 by A.P. "Pop" Sloan.

On May 15, 1896, an F5 category tornado passed through the west side of Howe and the Farmington community, sweeping away around 17 homes. On October 6, 1904, The Arlington Journal reported a fire through Howe's business district and named four stores it destroyed.

By 1914, the Texas Traction Company, better known as the Interurban, was providing service to Howe. This electric train ran between Denison and Dallas with a stop in Howe. By 1914, Howe also had the Farmers National Bank, the Howe Herald, three grain elevators, and an ice plant. The community's population had grown from 521 in 1904 to 680 in the early 1960s. After then, it rose rapidly through the early 1980s, reaching 2,173 by 1990. By 2000, the population was 2,478. 
Throughout most of its history, Howe remained primarily an agricultural center, but some oil has been produced in the area. During the early 1980s, Howe reported some 30 businesses. In 1981, local industries included a shirt manufacturer and a hydraulics company, and by 1991, the number of manufacturers in Howe had risen to five, including makers of plastics, electronics, and agricultural equipment.

On April 26, 2016, an F1 category tornado struck Howe around 10:00 pm, injuring three people and damaging over 20 homes. It started in a field behind the Summit Hill housing division, where a home was destroyed off Smith Road, then it proceeded northeast and crossed US Hwy 75, where trucker Gene Marshall was filming it; the storm tossed his truck and semitrailer to the other side of the road along with three  cars. It then hit the north side of the high school before going directly through Stark Lane. It then proceeded to the Luella/Ida area before it dissipated.

Geography

Howe is located in southern Grayson County at  (33.505089, –96.614239). It is at the intersection of U.S. Highway 75, Texas State Highway 5, and Farm Road 902, and it is bordered to the north by Sherman, the county seat.

Demographics

2020 census

As of the 2020 United States census, there were 3,571 people, 1,069 households, and 775 families residing in the town.

2000 census
At the 2000 census,  2,478 people, 924 households, and 693 families resided in the town. The population density was 641.2 per square mile (247.9/km). The 997 housing units averaged 258.0 per square mile (99.7/km). The racial makeup of the town was 94.87% White, 0.52% African American, 0.52% Native American, 0.12% Asian, 0.08% Pacific Islander, 2.10% from other races, and 1.78% from two or more races. Hispanics or Latinos of any race were 4.56% of the population.

Of the 924 households, 44.5% had children under the age of 18 living with them, 56.5% were married couples living together, 15.4% had a female householder with no husband present, and 25.0% were not families. About 21.4% of all households were made up of individuals, and 9.1% had someone living alone who was 65 years of age or older. The average household size was 2.68, and the average family size was 3.14.

The population was distributed as 31.9%  under the age of 18, 9.3% from 18 to 24, 32.1% from 25 to 44, 17.8% from 45 to 64, and 8.9% who were 65 years of age or older. The median age was 31 years. For every 100 females, there were 89.6 males. For every 100 females age 18 and over, there were 83.6 males.

The median household income was $34,963, and the median family income was $41,125. Males had a median income of $34,625 versus $22,829 for females. The per capita income for the town was $15,664. About 9.9% of families and 12.4% of the population were below the poverty line, including 12.4% of those under age 18 and 20.9% of those age 65 or over.

Traditions

Founders Day

Howe celebrates its history and origins every May with a Founders Day celebration.  The first Founders Day in 1986 featured a professional rodeo along with many festival events.  Each year, vendors line up in the downtown parking spaces with items for sale.  The festival features food, shaved ice, bounce houses, and the like.  It is a product of the Howe Area Chamber of Commerce.  The city celebrated the 30th anniversary of Founders Day in on May 7, 2016, with live music most of the evening.

Education
The city is served by the Howe Independent School District and is home to the Howe High School Bulldogs.

Media

Newspapers
 The Howe Enterprise
 The Herald Democrat

Radio stations
 KLAK Adult Contemporary 97.5
 KMAD  Mad Rock 102.5
 KMKT  Katy Country 93.1
  KDOC Doc FM 107.3

Television stations

 KTEN Channel 10 – (NBC)
 KTEN DT Channel 10.2 – (The CW Texoma)
 KTEN DT Channel 10.3 – (ABC)
 KXII Channel 12 – (CBS)
 KXII DT Channel 12.2 (My Texoma)
 KXII DT Channel 12.3 (Fox Texoma)

Notable people

 Dale Milford, U.S. Representative, was a resident of Howe at the time of his death

References

External links
 City of Howe official website
 Howe Development Alliance
 Howe Area of Commerce
 Howe Independent School District
 Texas State Historical Association

Towns in Grayson County, Texas
Towns in Texas